"By the Waters of the Minnetonka" is an American song written by James Mulloy Cavanass and Thurlow Lieurance.

Slim Whitman version 
Slim Whitman recorded this song for Imperial. It was released as a single (with "An Amateur in Love" on the flip side) in 1952.

Track listing

The Marty Gold Orchestra & Chorus version 
A version by The Marty Gold Orchestra & Chorus was included on their 1959 album By the Waters of the Minnetonka (Kapp KL 1125).

References 

1952 singles
Imperial Records singles
London Records singles
Slim Whitman songs